"Blue Flu" is the 3rd episode of the eighth season of the American television police sitcom series Brooklyn Nine-Nine, and the 146th overall episode of the series. The episode was written by co-executive producer Carol Kolb and April Quioh and directed by Claire Scanlon. It aired on August 19, 2021 on NBC, airing back-to-back with the follow-up episode, "Balancing".

The show revolves around the fictitious 99th precinct of the New York Police Department in Brooklyn and the officers and detectives that work in the precinct. In this episode, the Patrolmen's Benevolent Association engineers a walkout of uniformed officers in response to an alleged anti-cop incident, and Holt and Amy are left to manage a short-staffed precinct. During the mission, Boyle gets worrisome medical news while gathering evidence.

According to Nielsen Media Research, the episode was seen by an estimated 2.01 million household viewers and gained a 0.4 ratings share among adults aged 18–49. The episode received positive reviews from critics, who praised the cast, particularly Braugher's and Lo Truglio's performances.

Plot
Patrolmen's Benevolent Association head Frank O'Sullivan (John C. McGinley) engineers a walkout of uniformed officers by claiming illness in response to an anti-cop incident involving a mouse found in a burrito. Willing to investigate further and force the officers to return to work, Holt (Andre Braugher) orders the squad to investigate the incident.

Noticing that the officers report suffering infectious mononucleosis, Jake (Andy Samberg) decides to use Boyle (Joe Lo Truglio) to go to the doctor and get the diagnosis to prove the other officials are faking the reports. But Boyle's visit to the doctor soon turns concerning when the doctor notices a worrying sign on Boyle's testicles, which could be testicular cancer. Waiting for the test results causes Boyle to worry in the precinct. During a stakeout, he confesses to Jake that he fears dying as he won't see Nikolaj grow and miss more adventures with Jake, moving Jake to tears. Meanwhile, Holt and Amy (Melissa Fumero) ask other precincts for help in their under-staffed precinct. However, the precincts send their own "Hitchcocks and Scullys". In order to motivate them, Amy gives them pedometers, promising one week of overtime to whoever has the most steps.

Terry (Terry Crews) struggles to work due to a stomach bug and goes home. Holt asks Rosa (Stephanie Beatriz) for help and she provides information revealing that the officer planted the mouse in the burrito in exchange for a photo of Holt's tattoo. Holt shows it to O'Sullivan but he twists the situation into another to avoid calling off the Blue Flu. Terry manages to infiltrate the union and records the officers confessing to the deception. However, his stomach bug overshadows the recording and they lose evidence. To worsen the situation, Amy finds that the "Hitchcocks and Scullys" use massage chairs to increase their pedometers.

After getting the test results, Jake and Boyle celebrate as his condition is not lethal. They turn the report over to O'Sullivan, proving that the other officers aren't sick. O'Sullivan accepts faking it but says the officers are still sick because they were exposed by Terry's visit. A defeated Holt goes to the bar where Boyle gives him a talk about his fears. Holt then gets an idea. He confronts O'Sullivan at his office, proving that with fewer officers, the 99th precinct hit fewer complaints and bad records while managing to keep the crime rate unchanged. O'Sullivan is forced to end the Blue Flu or have the officers fired for missing work. As Holt addresses the precinct, Jake uses the opportunity to show Holt's tattoo (having paid $2,000 to Rosa for the photo) but the precinct is disappointed when it's just a decimal point. It is revealed that the photo is fake and the episode ends before Rosa says what the tattoo is.

Production
In August 2021, it was announced that the third episode of the season would be titled "Blue Flu" and that Carol Kolb and April Quioh would serve as writers while Claire Scanlon would direct.

Reception

Viewers
According to Nielsen Media Research, the episode was seen by an estimated 2.01 million household viewers and gained a 0.4 ratings share among adults aged 18–49. This means that 0.4 percent of all households with televisions watched the episode. This was a 50% increase over the previous episode, which was watched by 1.34 million viewers and a 0.3 ratings share. With these ratings, Brooklyn Nine-Nine was the highest rated show on NBC for the night, fourth on its timeslot and fourth for the night, behind Holey Moley, Beat Shazam, and Big Brother.

Critical reviews
"Blue Flu" received positive reviews from critics. Vikram Murthi of The A.V. Club gave the episode a "B+" rating, writing, "There was no possible way for Brooklyn Nine-Nine to please everybody, and thankfully it doesn't really try. But after the relatively exposition- and speech-heavy premiere that tried to do too much in the way of lip service and hedging, 'Blue Flu' features a premise that integrates Brooklyn Nine-Nines political consciousness into a novel episodic premise that's funny and compelling. It's a good example of a show adjusting to The Times without getting bogged down in defensive anxiety."

Brian Tallerico of Vulture gave the episode a 3 star rating out of 5 and wrote, "The creative team behind Brooklyn Nine-Nine has trotted out the same formula as the show's premiere week for its sophomore double feature, once again chaining an episode that tackles real-world concerns with one more centered on the personal lives of the members of the Nine-Nine. The result is a pair of episodes that kind of feel like an echo of last week rather than pushing forward any sort of season momentum. They both contain enough moments of humor and insight to work reasonably well on their own terms, but they're also both in the shadow of superior outings from just a week ago. Let's hope the pattern doesn't continue for a third week." Nick Harley of Den of Geek wrote, "'The Blue Flu' is also incredibly funny. This is the best Boyle material we've gotten in a long time."

References

External links

2021 American television episodes
Brooklyn Nine-Nine (season 8) episodes